Güneşli (Laz language: Tsagrina) is a village in the Hopa District, Artvin Province, Turkey. Its population is 118 (2021).

References

Villages in Hopa District